The 2011 Asian Women's Softball Championship was an international softball tournament which featured thirteen nations which was held from 20–28 September 2011 in Nantou County, Taiwan. Matches were held at the De-Hsin Baseball Stadium and Chao-Kuan Baseball Stadium. The top three teams qualified for the 2012 Women's Softball World Championship.

Participants

Source: Nantou County Government

Final ranking

Source:Softball Confederation of Asia

See also
 List of sporting events in Taiwan

References

Asian Women's Softball Championship
International sports competitions hosted by Taiwan
Soft
Softball in Taiwan